Just Push Play is the thirteenth studio album by American rock band Aerosmith, co-produced by song collaborators Marti Frederiksen and Mark Hudson and was released in March 6, 2001. The album's first single, "Jaded", became a Top 10 hit in the US and around the world. As a result, Just Push Play was certified Platinum within a month of its release.

Subsequent singles "Fly Away from Here", "Sunshine", and "Just Push Play", though garnering some airplay, failed to impact the Hot 100, although the latter two reached the US Mainstream Rock chart and the former appeared within the Adult Top 40.

Background
The album's cover, which was designed by Hajime Sorayama, features a gynoid resembling Marilyn Monroe. The illustration had already been used for the cover of a compilation album of various artists hits called Video Sound, released in 1985, and which did not include any Aerosmith songs.

Several songs were recorded for the album that went unused. "Ain't It True", "Easy", "Innocent Man", "I Love You Down", and "Sweet Due" can be linked as originating from these sessions. "Angel's Eye" was used for the soundtrack to the 2000 film Charlie's Angels. "Face" and "Won't Let You Down" were issued as bonus tracks on later pressings of the album. The track "Do You Wonder" was supposedly recorded for this album, as well.

In 2010, guitarist Joe Perry criticized the album:

Critical reception

Metacritic gave the album 65 out of 100 based on 14 generally favorable reviews. 

For his review of Just Push Play for Allmusic, Stephen Thomas Erlewine said that it was their best-sounding album in the past decade, as well as "tighter, savvier, and better" than anything since their 1989 album Pump, but it was not much compared to Pump and its 1987 predecessor, Permanent Vacation. He felt it lacked anything memorable, and the band's "refusal to act their age results in a couple of embarrassing slips into stodginess".

Darryl Stredan strongly disliked the album, to the point that he considered it proof that Aerosmith should stop making new music. Chris Willman of Entertainment Weekly called the album 'good but not great'. NME said that while most of the album is not new, it was their first to feature rap metal with songs like "Just Push Play" and "Outta Your Head". 

David Fricke of Rolling Stone said that Just Push Play was the closest Aerosmith had come to a 'great album' since 1976's Rocks, despite the 'weak spots' of the album's power ballads. Robert Christgau picked out the album's lead single, "Jaded", as a choice cut.

The album was nominated for three Grammy Awards in 2001, including Best Rock Album (Just Push Play), Best Rock Performance by a Duo or Group ("Jaded"), and Best Short Form Music Video ("Fly Away from Here").

Just Push Play debuted at No. 2 within the Billboard 200, selling over 240,000 copies in its first week.

Track listing

NB: On the original version, roughly 45 seconds after "Avant Garden" a hidden track entitled "Under My Skin Reprise" plays for about one minute. On the international version, the track is roughly 40 seconds after "Face" and on the Japanese version after "I Don't Want to Miss a Thing".

Personnel
Aerosmith
Steven Tylerlead vocals, piano, squeezebox, harmonica, percussion, additional guitar and drums, conga, backing vocals on "Drop Dead Gorgeous", mixing, production
Joe Perryguitar, slide guitar, pedal steel guitar, hurdy-gurdy, backing vocals, lead vocals on "Drop Dead Gorgeous", mixing, production
Brad Whitfordguitar
Tom Hamiltonbass guitar, fretless bass
Joey Kramerdrums
Additional musicians
Jim Coxpiano on "Fly Away From Here"
Paul Santokeyboards Kurzweil on "Fly Away from Here", Hammond organ on "Avant Garden", engineering at the Bryer Patch
Tower of Powerhorns on "Trip Hoppin'"
Dan Higginsclarinet, saxophone on "Trip Hoppin'"
Chelsea Tylerbacking vocals on "Under My Skin"
Paul Carusoloop programming on "Drop Dead Gorgeous", engineering at the Boneyard
Liv Tylerwhispers on "Avant Garden"
Tony Perryscratching on "Just Push Play"
Production
Marti Frederiksen – production, mixing, recording
Mark Hudson – production, mixing
Mike Shipley – mixing
Richard Chycki – recording
Bryan Carrigan – additional engineering
David Campbell – strings arrangements, except on "Sunshine", "Luv Lies", and "Avant Garden"
Jim Cox – string arrangements on "Sunshine", "Luv Lies", and "Avant Garden", horns arrangements
Alan Sides – engineering on strings
Scott Gordon – engineering on horns and strings
George Marino – mastering
John Kalodner – John Kalodner
Lesie Langlo – artist and repertoire coordination
Kevin Reagan – art direction, design
Matthew Lindauer – design
Mark Seliger – photography
Hajime Sorayama – illustrations

Studios
Aerosmith recorded Just Push Play from April to December 2000 at:
The Boneyard & The Bryer Patch 
Long View Farms Studio, North Brookfield, Massachusetts
Ocean Way Studios, Los Angeles
Sound Techniques
Village Recorders, Los Angeles
Pearl White Studios
Whatinthewhatthe? Studios
The Studio in the Sunset Marquis, West Hollywood, California

Charts

Weekly charts

Year-end charts

Certifications

References

Sources

Aerosmith albums
2001 albums
Albums produced by Marti Frederiksen
Albums produced by Mark Hudson (musician)
Columbia Records albums